Jayapura is a small village near Mysore in the state of Karnataka in India.

Location
Jayapura is located in Mysore taluk of Mysore district on Mananthavady Road. The postal code of the village is 570008. The village is 17 km away from Mysore.

Suburbs
Jayapura has Nanjangud on the east and H.D.Kote on the west. Srirangapatana is on the north and Hunsur is on the west. The telephone code of the village is 0821.

See also
 Anthara Santhe
 Daripura, Mysore
 Harohalli
 Mandanahalli

References

Villages in Mysore district